The Denmark national football team statistics show the accomplishments of the players and coaches of the Danish men's ever since the controlling organ of the team, the Danish Football Association (DBU), started registering official games at the 1908 Summer Olympics.

Key

Most appearances

The 25 most capped players for Denmark are:

* denotes members of the 1992 European Championship-winning team.

Goalscorers

Top goalscorers
With 52 goals, Poul "Tist" Nielsen is currently the men's number one goalscorer in Danish football history. As of 18 January 2023, players with 10 goals or more for Denmark are:

 denotes members of the 1992 European Championship-winning team.

Highest goal average
Only people with at least five goals have been included.

Team captains
As of 18 January 2023, the ten players with the most caps as Danish team captains are:

Players still playing or available for selection are in bold. * denotes members of the 1992 European Championship-winning team.

Cards
As of 29 March 2015, the caution and sending-off statistics are:

Cautions

Players still playing or available for selection are in bold. * denotes members of the 1992 European Championship-winning team.

Sending-offs

Players still playing or available for selection are in bold. * denotes members of the 1992 European Championship-winning team.

Managers
As of 10 June 2022, the management statistics are:

Note that the Denmark national football team has not had a designated team manager for every match.

Matches

Note that Average points per game is calculated by using 3 points for a win and 1 point for a draw. Up to date as of 22 September 2021.

Footnotes
 GF = Goals for
 GA = Goals against
 Richard Møller Nielsen coached 8 games in the 1988 Summer Olympics qualifications campaign, winning 6, drawing 1 and losing 1, with the combined score 25–3.
  Last updated 30 June 2014.
 In all 169 matches, played through 1911-12 (5 matches), 1916 (4), 1919-20 (6), 1920-38 (77), 1939 (4), 1940-45 (12), 1946-47 (10), 1948-52 (24), 1952-56 (24), 1957 (1), 1959 (1) and 1961 (1).

References

External links
 Landsholdsspillere med mere end 50 kampe at Danish Football Association
 Palle "Banks" Jørgensen, "Landsholdets 681 profiler fra 1908 til i dag", TIPS-Bladet, 2002, 
 Peders Fodboldstatistik
 Haslunds fodboldsider

Records and statistics
Denmark